The Journal of Biosciences is a peer-reviewed scientific journal published by the Indian Academy of Sciences, Bengaluru, India. The current editor-in-chief is Prof.  B J Rao (IISER Tirupati, Tirupati). According to the Journal Citation Reports, the journal has a 2019 impact factor of 1.65.

History 
The Journal of Biosciences was established in 1934 as the Proceedings of the Indian Academy of Sciences (Section B). In 1978, the Proceedings were split into three sections: Proceedings-Animal Sciences, Proceedings-Plant Sciences, and Proceedings-Experimental Biology. The latter section was renamed Journal of Biosciences in 1979, and in 1991 it was merged again with the other two sections.

Aim and Scope 
The journal covers all areas of biology and is considered the premier journal in the country within its scope. It publishes research and reviews, series articles, perspectives, clipboards, commentaries, and short communications. Special theme issues are also published. The details of the editorial board is available at the link given below.

Abstracting and indexing 
The journal is abstracted and indexed in:

See also
 Open access in India

References 

Biology journals
Publications established in 1934
Academic journals published by learned and professional societies of India